Omorgus acinus is a species of hide beetle in the subfamily Omorginae and subgenus Afromorgus.

References

acinus
Beetles described in 1980